Vasili Aleksandrovich Zapryagayev (born 18 August 1998) is a Russian football player. He plays for FC Yadro Saint Petersburg.

Club career
He made his debut in the Russian Football National League for FC Zenit-2 Saint Petersburg on 8 July 2017 in a game against FC Shinnik Yaroslavl.

On 21 February 2019, he signed with FC Tom Tomsk.

References

External links
 Profile by Russian Football National League

1998 births
Footballers from Saint Petersburg
Living people
Russian footballers
Association football defenders
FC Zenit-2 Saint Petersburg players
FC Tom Tomsk players
Russian First League players
Russian Second League players